Christopher Trent is a British writer and was born in Sussex.

Education

After spending most of his childhood in Twickenham in the UK and Richmond in the UK. He received his initial education St Paul's School, and then went onto University College Oxford. He studied classics, philosophy and archaeology at the City Literary Institute.

Biography

After the war, during which he was Deputy Chief Information Officer for the North-West, he then devoted his time to full-time writing and took an interest in the Fens and London
Perhaps one of his best books is Motoring Holidays in Britain published in 1959 which shows readers many beauty spots reached by unfrequented routes, every one of which has been travelled by the author and illustrated by his own photographs. These routes have stood the test of time and are as enjoyable today as they were 50 years ago, particularly if you own a classic car.

Bibliography

 Greater London: Its Growth and Development over 2000 years.
 The Changing face of England 
 The Story of England in Brick and Stone
 The Cities of London and Westminster
 Dictionary of Archaeology
 The ABC of Photography
 Colour Photography
 Motoring Holidays in Britain

External links
  Drainage in the Fens

Footnotes

British non-fiction writers
Living people
British male writers
Year of birth missing (living people)
Male non-fiction writers